Leatrice is a given name. Notable people with the name include:

 Leatrice Eiseman, American color specialist
 Leatrice Joy (1893–1985), American actress 
 Leatrice Morin (1922–2009), American politician

See also
 Beatrice (disambiguation)

Feminine given names